Eduard Damirovich Kudermetov (born 3 March 1972) is a Soviet and Russian former professional ice hockey forward. He is a two-time Russian Champion.

Awards and honors

Personal life
His daughters Veronika and Polina are professional tennis players.

References

External links
Biographical information and career statistics from Eliteprospects.com, or The Internet Hockey Database

1972 births
Living people
Ak Bars Kazan players
Sokil Kyiv players
Metallurg Magnitogorsk players
HC CSKA Moscow players
HC Spartak Moscow players
Russian ice hockey forwards
Volga Tatars
Tatar sportspeople
Tatar people of Russia